(E)-β-Ocimene synthase (EC 4.2.3.106, β-ocimene synthase, AtTPS03, ama0a23, LjEbetaOS, MtEBOS) is an enzyme with systematic name geranyl-diphosphate diphosphate-lyase ((E)-β-ocimene-forming). This enzyme catalyses the following chemical reaction

 geranyl diphosphate  (E)-β-ocimene + diphosphate

This enzyme is widely distributed in plants, which release β-ocimene when attacked by herbivorous insects.

References

External links 
 

EC 4.2.3